STAA doubles or double pups are a type of long combination vehicle in the United States. They are named for the Surface Transportation Assistance Act (STAA) of 1982. The doubles are connected via a dolly. This long combination vehicle is the only combination of trailers allowed nationwide in the United States. STAA double make up less than 3% of the freight trailer fleet in the United States.

See also
B-train
Federal Bridge Weight Formula
Long combination vehicle

References 

Trucks
Articulated vehicles